41 may refer to:

 41 (number)
 one of the years 41 BC, AD 41, 1941, 2041

Art and entertainment
 41 (film), a 2007 documentary about Nicholas O'Neill, the youngest victim of the Station nightclub fire
 41, a 2012 film by Glenn Triggs
 41, a 2012 documentary about President George H. W. Bush.
 "#41" (song), a song by the Dave Matthews Band
 Survivor 41, the 41st installment of CBS's reality program Survivor
 "Forty One", a song by Karma to Burn from the album Appalachian Incantation, 2010

People
 George H. W. Bush, or "Bush 41" (to distinguish him from his son, George W. Bush), 41st president of the United States
 Nick "41" MacLaren, member of the New Zealand hip hop duo Frontline

See also
 HP-41C, a series of calculators made by Hewlett-Packard
 FOCAL (Hewlett-Packard) (Forty-one calculator language), the language used to program HP-41 calculators